Sharpsville is the name of several places in the United States of America:
Sharpsville, Indiana
Sharpsville, Pennsylvania

See also
 Sharpeville, Gauteng, a township in South Africa, site of
 Sharpeville massacre (1960)